The George Town CBD is the central business district within George Town, the capital city of the state of Penang in Malaysia. As the term implies, the CBD contains the highest concentration of financial and banking services within George Town, serving as the city's financial heart.

Traditionally, Beach Street has been regarded as the central business district of George Town. One of the first streets to be created in Penang, Beach Street was where several international banks built their branches in the late 19th century.  To this day, many of the banks remain along the street. In addition, within the vicinity of Beach Street, governmental buildings were constructed, making the area the administrative centre of Penang for much of the state's history.

In recent decades, various banking, financial and auditing services have been concentrated at Northam Road as well, turning the road into George Town's second CBD. The adjoining Gurney Drive, with a high concentration of skyscrapers, also forms part of the city's newer CBD.

Historic CBD: Beach Street 

Historically, this district coincides with the particular area that was first explored and developed by Captain Francis Light after his founding of Penang in 1786. It is centred at Beach Street and Light Street, which are among the first streets to be created on Penang Island. It is loosely bounded by Pitt Street (now Jalan Masjid Kapitan Keling) to the west, Chulia Street to the south and Weld Quay along the city's eastern shore.

The CBD therefore covers the several international banks along Beach Street, such as Standard Chartered Bank, HSBC, Oversea-Chinese Banking Corporation, United Overseas Bank and Bank of China, as well as administrative buildings like the City Hall and the State Assembly Building, in a manner similar to the Civic District within downtown Singapore. The City Hall, built in 1903, houses the head office of the Penang Island City Council, while the State Assembly Building is the meeting place of the Penang State Legislative Assembly.

Due to the numerous Malaysian and international banks that operate within the CBD, George Town serves as the commercial centre for northern Malaysia.

In addition, the CBD serves as a transportation hub within George Town. The city is linked with the Malay Peninsula via Rapid Ferry, with its Ferry Terminal at Weld Quay. Right next to the Ferry Terminal is a Rapid Penang bus terminal, where most bus routes within Penang Island begin and terminate.

New CBD: Northam/Gurney 

In the 1990s, as George Town's banks began reassessing their spatial requirements to accommodate greater business volumes, a number of commercial developments commenced along Northam Road. The commercial skyscrapers along Northam Road quickly attracted various banking, auditing and other financial services, as the newer buildings offer more space and amenities that the colonial-era buildings at Beach Street lacked. By the early 2000s, Northam Road emerged the city's second CBD.

In addition, Gurney Drive, which adjoins Northam Road and also has a high concentration of skyscrapers, is now considered as part of George Town's newer CBD. Plans have been drawn up to attract financial services to the popular seafront promenade, which already functions as one of the more prominent shopping streets in Penang. In 2016, the Gurney Wharf project, which aims to create a seaside recreational park along Gurney Drive, was launched, with land reclamation ongoing off the shoreline.

The accumulation of financial services along Northam Road and Gurney Drive is partly fueled by the inscription of the city centre as a UNESCO World Heritage Site since 2008. The new UNESCO rulings include a building restriction on construction works exceeding five storeys or 18 metres. As both Northam Road and Gurney Drive lie outside the UNESCO-protected site, commercial properties along these coastal roads are not impacted by the new building guidelines.

See also 
 George Town
 Penang Island
 Penang
 Greater Penang Conurbation

References 

George Town, Penang
Central business districts